Single instruction, multiple threads (SIMT) is an execution model used in parallel computing where single instruction, multiple data (SIMD) is combined with multithreading. It is different from SPMD in that all instructions in all "threads" are executed in lock-step. The SIMT execution model has been implemented on several GPUs and is relevant for general-purpose computing on graphics processing units (GPGPU), e.g. some supercomputers combine CPUs with GPUs.

The processors, say a number  of them, seem to execute many more than  tasks. This is achieved by each processor having multiple "threads" (or "work-items" or "Sequence of SIMD Lane operations"), which execute in lock-step, and are analogous to SIMD lanes.

The simplest way to understand SIMT is to imagine a multi-core system, where each core has its own register file, its own ALUs (both SIMD and Scalar) and its own data cache, but that unlike a standard multi-core system which has multiple independent instruction caches and decoders, as well as multiple independent Program Counter registers, the instructions are synchronously broadcast to all SIMT cores from a single unit with a single instruction cache and a single instruction decoder which reads instructions using a single Program Counter.

The key difference between SIMT and SIMD lanes is that each of the SIMT cores may have a completely different Stack Pointer (and thus perform computations on completely different data sets), whereas SIMD lanes are simply part of an ALU that know nothing about memory per se.

History

SIMT was introduced by Nvidia in the Tesla GPU microarchitecture with the G80 chip. ATI Technologies, now AMD, released a competing product slightly later on May 14, 2007, the TeraScale 1-based "R600" GPU chip.

Description 

As access time of all the widespread RAM types (e.g. DDR SDRAM, GDDR SDRAM, XDR DRAM, etc.) is still relatively high, engineers came up with the idea to hide the latency that inevitably comes with each memory access. Strictly, the latency-hiding is a feature of the zero-overhead scheduling implemented by modern GPUs. This might or might not be considered to be a property of 'SIMT' itself.

SIMT is intended to limit instruction fetching overhead, i.e. the latency that comes with memory access, and is used in modern GPUs (such as those of Nvidia and AMD) in combination with 'latency hiding' to enable high-performance execution despite considerable latency in memory-access operations. This is where the processor is oversubscribed with computation tasks, and is able to quickly switch between tasks when it would otherwise have to wait on memory. This strategy is comparable to multithreading in CPUs (not to be confused with multi-core). As with SIMD, another major benefit is the sharing of the control logic by many data lanes, leading to an increase in computational density. One block of control logic can manage N data lanes, instead of replicating the control logic N times.

A downside of SIMT execution is the fact that thread-specific control-flow is performed using "masking", leading to poor utilization where a processor's threads follow different control-flow paths. For instance, to handle an IF-ELSE block where various threads of a processor execute different paths, all threads must actually process both paths (as all threads of a processor always execute in lock-step), but masking is used to disable and enable the various threads as appropriate. Masking is avoided when control flow is coherent for the threads of a processor, i.e. they all follow the same path of execution. The masking strategy is what distinguishes SIMT from ordinary SIMD, and has the benefit of inexpensive synchronization between the threads of a processor.

See also 
 General-purpose computing on graphics processing units (GPGPU)

References 

Classes of computers
Computer architecture
GPGPU
Parallel computing
SIMD computing
Threads (computing)